Ceratobregma is a genus of triplefins in the family Tripterygiidae.

Species
 Spotted spiny-eye triplefin, Ceratobregma acanthops (Whitley, 1964)
 Helen's triplefin, Ceratobregma helenae Holleman, 1987

References
 

 
Tripterygiidae